William Cabell Rives (May 4, 1793April 25, 1868) was an American lawyer, planter, politician and diplomat from Virginia. Initially a Jackson Democrat as well as member of the First Families of Virginia, Rives served in the Virginia House of Delegates representing first Nelson County, then Albemarle County, Virginia, before service in both the U.S. House and Senate (his final term as a Whig). Rives also served two separate terms as U.S. Minister to France. During the Andrew Jackson administration, Rives negotiated a treaty whereby the French agreed to pay the U.S. for spoliation claims from the Napoleonic Wars. During the American Civil War, Rives became a Delegate to the Provisional Confederate Congress and the Confederate House of Representatives.

Early life and education
Rives was born at "Union Hill", the  James River plantation estate of his grandfather, Col. William Cabell, in what was then Amherst County, Virginia and is now Nelson County. His parents were Robert Rives (1764–1845) and the former Margaret Cabell (c. 1770–1815). Robert Rives of Sussex County had served in the patriot army during the final Yorktown campaign, then became a commission merchant (first operating as Robert Rives and Company and later as Brown, Rives and Company), with Thomas Jefferson as one of his clients. He built a plantation, Oak Hill, in Nelson County in 1802, where he would bury his wife, and later be buried. On his death in 1845, the personal estate of Rives Sr. would be valued at $100,000 and included lands in Albemarle, Buckingham, Campbell and Nelson Counties. Three of their sons, including William C. Rives would serve as legislators. Others included Robert Rives Jr. (1798-1869) and future Virginia Court of Appeals and U.S. District Judge Alexander Rives. His distant nephew Alexander Brown wrote books about the early history of Virginia as well as The Cabells and their Kin.

After private tutoring appropriate to his station, W. C. Rives attended Hampden-Sydney College, followed by the College of William and Mary in Williamsburg. He then studied law with Thomas Jefferson at Monticello in  nearer home.

During the War of 1812, he joined the local militia, which defended the Commonwealth.

Personal life
In 1819, Rives married Judith Page Walker (1802–1882), the daughter of Francis Walker, and likewise of the First Families of Virginia. Their eldest son, Francis Robert Rives (1821-1891) followed his father's path into the law and diplomacy, but after returning from his foreign service in 1845, married banker's daughter Matilda Antonia Barclay and lived in Manhattan as well as Dutchess County, New York, with his firstborn son George Lockhart Rives (1849-1917) following family tradition by becoming a lawyer and diplomat (but not owning slaves). This Rives' second son, William C. Rives Jr. (1826-1890), likewise began a legal career and also operated Virginia plantations using enslaved labor. The junior Rives owned the still-standing Cobham Park Estate near Charlottesville,  and his son, also William Cabell Rives (1850–1938) donated the Peace Cross and supported building the Washington National Cathedral. The youngest son, Alfred Landon Rives, became a prominent engineer (working on the U.S. Capitol and later for railroads), and his granddaughter Amélie Rives became a novelist, best known for The Quick or the Dead? (1888). The Rives also had daughters Grace Rives (1822- ), Amelia Rives Sigourney (1832-1873) and Emma Rives (1835-1892).

Early career

In 1814, Rives was admitted to the bar at Richmond. He began his law practice in Nelson County, but after his marriage moved to her estate Castle Hill, near Cobham in Albemarle County. This remained his primary residence for the rest of his life.

Like his father and other family members, Rives operated his plantations using enslaved labor. In the 1830 federal census, he owned 26 enslaved men and 26 enslaved women in Albemarle County. In the 1850 federal census, he owned 54 slaves in Albemarle County. A decade later, Rives owned 68 slaves and his son William C. Rives Jr. owned  24 slaves in Albemarle County. His brother or nephew Robert Rives Jr. owned 43 slaves in Albemarle County in 1850,. and 70 slaves a decade later.

Political career

Rives's political career began by as one of Nelson County's delegates in the state constitutional convention of 1816. Rives then won election and re-election as one of Nelson County's delegates (part time) in the Virginia House of Delegates (serving 1817–19), then won election as one of Albemarle County's delegates in 1822. During that session, his younger brother Robert Rives Jr., also served, as one of the Nelson County delegates.

Rives did not seek re-election to the Virginia legislature because in November 1822, voters in Virginia's 10th congressional district (which included both counties) elected him to represent them in the United States House of Representatives. He also won re-election and served from 1823 to 1829. In 1829 President Andrew Jackson nominated Rives to become Minister to France.

When Rives took office, compensation demands for captured American ships and sailors, dating from the Napoleonic era, caused strained relations between the American and French governments. The French Navy had captured and sent American ships to Spanish ports while holding their crews captive, thus forcing them to labor without any charges or judicial rules. Secretary of State Martin Van Buren, considered relations between the U.S. and France "hopeless." Yet, Rives was able to convince the French government to sign a reparations treaty on July 4, 1831, that would award the U.S. ₣ 25,000,000 ($5,000,000) in damages. However, the French government fell behind in its payments due to internal financial and political difficulties, but after firm insistence from the United States, payments were finally made in February 1836.

Rives was presented as a candidate for the Democratic vice presidential nomination in 1835, but the nomination went to Richard M. Johnson, in spite of having been presidential nominee Martin Van Buren's preferred candidate.

After Rives returned from France, Virginia legislators elected (and twice re-elected) him to the United States Senate. He replaced conservative Littleton Tazewell. In 1834, Rives resigned because he disagreed the proposed senatorial censure of President Jackson's removal of government deposits from the Bank of the United States. However, the next legislature again elected Rives as Senator, this time to replace John Tyler (thus he did not succeed himself). During his third term, Rives had become a member of the Whig Party and voted to expunge record of the censure from Senate records.

Rives also served on the Board of Visitors for the University of Virginia from 1834 to 1849, and for many years as president of the Virginia Historical Society.

In 1849, Rives once again accepted an appointment (and the Senate confirmed him) as Minister to France. He served until 1853, when he returned to his Virginia plantations. In 1831, Rives was elected as a member of the American Philosophical Society.

Later life and American Civil War
Rives published several books and pamphlets, including the Life and Character of John Hampden (1845), Ethics of Christianity (1855) and Life and Times of James Madison (4 vols., Boston, 1859–68). His wife also published several volumes: The Canary Bird (1835), Epitome of the Holy Bible (1846), Souveniers of a Residence in Europe (1842), Home and the World (1857),

In 1860, Rives endorsed the call for a Constitutional Union Party Convention. He received most of Virginia's first ballot votes for President. Rives then became one of Virginia's unofficial delegates to the February 1861 Peace Conference in Washington, which sought to prevent the American Civil War by preserving slavery. Although Rives spoke out against secession, he was loyal to Virginia when it seceded. He served in the Provisional Confederate Congress from 1861 to 1862 and the Second Confederate Congress from 1864 to 1865.

Death and legacy

Rives died at Castle Hill in 1868 and was buried in the family cemetery. In addition to re surviving historic estate homes, Rives is the namesake of the town of Rivesville, West Virginia.

See also
 
 
 McCoy, Drew R. The Last of the Fathers: James Madison and the Republican Legacy. Cambridge, MA: Cambridge University Press, 1989, pp. 323–369.

References

External links 
 

1793 births
1868 deaths
People from Amherst County, Virginia
American people of English descent
Democratic-Republican Party members of the United States House of Representatives from Virginia
Jacksonian members of the United States House of Representatives from Virginia
Jacksonian United States senators from Virginia
Virginia Democrats
Democratic Party United States senators from Virginia
Virginia Whigs
Whig Party United States senators from Virginia
Chairmen of the Senate Committee on Foreign Relations
Virginia Constitutional Unionists
Deputies and delegates to the Provisional Congress of the Confederate States
Members of the Confederate House of Representatives from Virginia
1836 United States vice-presidential candidates
Members of the Virginia House of Delegates
Ambassadors of the United States to France
19th-century American diplomats
People from Albemarle County, Virginia
People from Nelson County, Virginia
Virginia lawyers
19th-century American lawyers
College of William & Mary alumni
Hampden–Sydney College alumni
Cabell family
Rives family